Iconaster is a genus of echinoderms belonging to the family Goniasteridae.

The species of this genus are found in Australia and Malesia.

Species:

Iconaster elegans 
Iconaster longimanus 
Iconaster uchelbeluuensis 
Iconaster vanuatuensis

References

Goniasteridae
Asteroidea genera